The Brisbane School Girls Sports Association (BSGSA) was a group of mainly girls' schools in Brisbane, Queensland, Australia that was founded in 1996. The association grew to include 12 members and 9 associate members, both girls' and coeducational schools. The organisation was split in 2014 with most of the girls-only colleges forming the Catholic Secondary Schoolgirls' Sports Association. Many of the coeducational schools formed the South Eastern Colleges Association.

Former member schools

Sports 
 Cricket
 Basketball
 Football (AFL)
 Hockey
 Netball
 Soft Ball
 Soccer
 Touch Football
 Volleyball

See also 
 Catholic Secondary Schoolgirls' Sports Association
 List of schools in Queensland

References

Australian school sports associations